Juan Ignacio Barinaga (born 10 October 2000) is an Argentine professional footballer who plays as a right-back for Belgrano.

Career
Barinaga started his career with Newell's Old Boys, before heading to ADIUR at the age of thirteen. Following a 2016 trial, Barinaga joined Belgrano in early 2017. He was moved into Alfredo Berti's senior set-up in mid-2019, originally as an unused substitute for a Copa Argentina loss to Real Pilar and a Primera B Nacional win over Barracas Central in July and August respectively. Barinaga's professional debut would arrive on 6 September during a 1–1 draw on the road against Deportivo Morón, after he was substituted on in place of Sebastián Luna. He scored his first goal on 5 December versus Independiente Rivadavia.

Career statistics
.

References

External links

2000 births
Living people
Footballers from Rosario, Santa Fe
Argentine footballers
Association football defenders
Primera Nacional players
Club Atlético Belgrano footballers